Botafogo Futebol Clube, commonly referred to as Botafogo da Paraíba, Botafogo-PB or simply Botafogo is a Brazilian professional club based in João Pessoa, Paraíba founded on 28 September 1931.

Botafogo is the top ranked team from Paraíba in CBF's national club ranking, at 51st overall.

History
On September 28, 1931, the club was founded at Centro de João Pessoa, João Pessoa city, by Beraldo de Oliveira, Manoel Feitosa, Livonete Pessoa, José de Melo, Edson de Moura Machado and Enock Lins, all of them Botafogo of Rio de Janeiro supporters.  Beraldo de Oliveira was chosen as the club's first president.

In 1932, Botafogo played its first match, against São Bento. The Liga Suburbana match ended in a 2–2 draw.

In 1936, Botafogo won its first professional title, the Paraíba state championship.

In 1976, the club disputed the Campeonato Brasileiro Série A for the first time. Botafogo was eliminated in the second round, and finished in 25th position.

In 1985, Botafogo finished 19th in the Campeonato Brasileiro Série A, which is the club's all-time best position in the competition.

In 1989, Botafogo disputed Copa do Brasil's first edition. The team was knocked out in the first round by Cruzeiro, after two draws, on the away goals rule (the first leg, in João Pessoa was 1–1, and the second leg, in Belo Horizonte, ended 0–0).

The 2011 season saw Botafogo, for the first time in their history, the club advanced to the Copa do Brasil's second round after beating Vitória 3–1 on aggregate. Belo was knocked out in the second round by Caxias, after losing 4–1 on aggregate. Botafogo's first national title is the Série D, which was won in 2013, when they beat Juventude in the final.

Stadium

Botafogo's home matches are usually played at Almeidão stadium, which has a maximum capacity of 40,000 people. Its official name is Estádio José Américo de Almeida Filho.

The club also owns a training ground named CT Maravilha do Contorno. The total training ground area is 10 ha.

Rivals
Botafogo's most important rivals are Treze, Campinense and Auto Esporte. The João Pessoa derby between Botafogo and Auto Esporte is commonly known as Botauto.

Current squad

Other sports
Besides football, Botafogo also has other sports sections, such as futsal and basketball.

Logo
The club's logo was inspired by Botafogo of Rio de Janeiro one. However, Botafogo da Paraíba's star is red. The star is red because, in 1976, the radio announcer Ivan Tomaz decided that the club's logo should have the same colors of Paraíba state flag, black and red.

Club colors
Botafogo's colors are red, black and white.

Nickname
The club is nicknamed Belo, meaning beautiful in Portuguese. This nickname was created by Antônio de Abreu e Lima, a club's counselor, after the club scored a goal considered very beautiful by him.

Mascot
Botafogo da Paraíba's mascot is a sheriff.

Honours
 Campeonato Brasileiro Série D
 Winners (1): 2013

 Campeonato Paraibano
 Winners (30): 1936, 1937, 1938, 1944, 1945, 1947, 1948, 1949, 1953, 1954, 1955, 1957, 1968, 1969, 1970, 1975, 1976, 1977, 1978, 1984, 1986, 1988, 1998, 1999, 2003, 2013, 2014, 2017, 2018, 2019

 Copa Paraíba
 Winners (1): 2010

References

External links

Official Website
Fansite

Botafogo Futebol Clube (PB)
Association football clubs established in 1931
Football clubs in Paraíba
1931 establishments in Brazil
Campeonato Brasileiro Série D winners